Sarah Helen Tolbert is an American chemist who is a Professor in the Department of Chemistry and Biochemistry at the University of California, Los Angeles. Her research considers self-assembled nanomaterials, which includes inorganic phases and colloidal materials.

Early life and education 
Tolbert's father, Bert Tolbert, was a professor of chemistry at the University of Colorado Boulder. She was one of four daughters. Tolbert was an undergraduate student at Yale University. She moved to the University of California, Berkeley for graduate studies, where she studied the structural, optical and cooperative properties of nanomaterials. She was a postdoctoral scholar at the University of California, Santa Barbara.

Research and career 
Tolbert is interested in the nanoscale assembly of materials, and how these nanostructures give rise to novel phenomena. In particular, Tolbert has investigated arrays of colloids. Colloids assemble into closely-packed areas that can be used to create large scale periodic photonics materials.

Tolbert is interested in inorganic/organic co-assembly. To this end she combines block co-polymers or organic surfactants with short-chain inorganic oligomers. Her early work involved the development of novel conjugated polymer morphologies for efficient light-emitting diodes. Amongst these morphologies, Tolbert showed it was possible to embed polymers in a silica host matrix, where stretching the matrix results in aligned polymer chains that emit linearly polarized light.

Tolbert works on self-assembled nanomaterials. She is particularly interested in introducing structure and periodicity to composite materials. Tolbert has studied phase transitions in inorganic solids. She has created novel, nanostructured electrodes to allow the fast charging of batteries. These include molybdenum disulphide nanocrystal composites, where internal atomic-scale pathways allow lithium ions to speedily move through the electrode. The nanostructure electrodes not only support the efficient charging of batteries but also stable charge and discharging cycles.

Tolbert is a developer for Battery Streak, a spin-out company who look to reduce that charging time of electronic devices.

Awards and honors 
 Alfred P. Sloan Fellowship (2001)
 National Science Foundation CAREER Award (2000)
 Beckman Young Investigators Award (2000)
 Office of Naval Research Young Investigator Award (1999)

Selected publications

Personal life 
Tolbert's three sisters are all academics, including atmospheric chemist Margaret Tolbert, political scientist Caroline Tolbert and ethnomusicologist Elizabeth Tolbert. She was one of four daughters. Tolbert met her husband, Benjamin Schwartz, whilst a graduate student at the University of California, Berkeley.

References 

Living people
Year of birth missing (living people)
University of California, Los Angeles faculty
Yale University alumni
UC Berkeley College of Chemistry alumni
American women chemists
Inorganic chemists
American materials scientists
Women materials scientists and engineers
21st-century American women